Kılavuzlar can refer to:

 Kılavuzlar, Karabük
 Kılavuzlar, Karamanlı